From the Green Hill is an album by Polish jazz trumpeter and composer Tomasz Stańko recorded in 1998 and released on the ECM label.

Reception
The AllMusic review by Thom Jurek awarded the album 4 stars stating "Over 14 tunes, Tomasz Stanko reveals once again why he is a bandleader of great authority and integrity. This is an ensemble of powerful individuals and no less than three composers among them. Stanko's arrangements are carried out with equanimity and grace as well as precision and musicality. The result is an album that, while not as attention grabbing as Litania, is as musically inventive and challenging as its predecessor, and wholly more satisfying than most of what comes from Eastern Europe in the name of jazz at the end of the 20th century".

Track listing
All compositions by Tomasz Stańko except as indicated
 "Domino" (John Surman) - 8:06 
 "Litania (Part One) (Krzysztof Komeda) - 2:41 
 "Stone Ridge" (Surman) - 8:00 
 "...Y Despues de Todo" - 3:59 
 "Litania (Part Two)" (Komeda) - 2:06 
 "Quintet's Time" - 6:48 
 "Pantronic" - 3:07 
 "The Lark in the Dark" - 6:41 
 "Love Theme from Farewell to Maria" - 6:21 
 "...From the Green Hill" - 7:46 
 "Buschka" - 7:10 
 "Roberto Zucco" - 2:57 
 "Domino's Intro" (Surman) - 1:03 
 "Argentyna" - 6:48 
Recorded at Rainbow Studio in Oslo, Norway in August 1998.

Personnel
Tomasz Stańko - trumpet
John Surman - baritone saxophone, bass clarinet
Dino Saluzzi - bandoneon
Michelle Makarski - violin
Anders Jormin - bass
Jon Christensen - drums

References

ECM Records albums
Tomasz Stańko albums
1998 albums
Albums produced by Manfred Eicher